Tiffany Jane Cromwell (born 6 July 1988) is an Australian road and gravel cyclist, who currently rides for UCI Women's WorldTeam .

Career

Road

Junior career 
Starting in 2002, after being identified by the South Australian sports institute talent identification program, Cromwell began her cycling career. Cycling was not the first sport Cromwell picked up, having done ballet, running, triathlons and basketball beforehand, the last of which she had family ties to. Despite an interest in pursuing basketball as a career before cycling, Cromwell admits her height 'always let [her] down'. Initially, Cromwell disliked cycling, citing that she was 'Tiny and one of the worst in [her] group' on the track, but soon discovered her love for the sport when she placed third in her first road race in the state championships.

After several podiums in junior Oceania games, one of Cromwell's first international wins came in 2008 at the Sea Otter Classic in California, having made a solo attack in the last few laps despite a  wind. She then went on to win the race the following year by winning solo again.

Senior career 
Cromwell joined her first European based team in 2010 with the  after a contract with another team fell through. Due to communication issues, both team and rider decided to part ways in the middle of 2011. Cromwell then rode for the  team until the end of the season.

In 2012 Cromwell joined the Australian team . Here, she picked up some of her major wins. One of which was a win in stage 5 of the Giro d'Italia Femminile. With , Cromwell also picked up her first major one day event win at the 2013 Omloop Het Nieuwsblad, with Cromwell winning in a sprint against Megan Guarnier to claim her first spring classics victory.

For 2014, Cromwell joined . She recorded several stage podiums in the 2014 Tour Cycliste Féminin International de l'Ardèche and finished second in the mountains classification. Cromwell represented Australia at the Commonwealth Games, losing out on a bronze medal in the road race in a two-up sprint with South Africa's Ashleigh Moolman. The following year, she finished third in stage 1 of the Giro d'Italia Femminile.

After  folded at the end of the 2015 season, Cromwell joined  for the 2016 season; Cromwell finished third at Omloop Het Nieuwsblad, and won stage four of the Giro d'Italia Femminile. The following year, she won stage one of the Thüringen Rundfahrt der Frauen. In 2018, Cromwell was again selected to represent Australia at the Commonwealth Games, where, as road captain, she was part of the team that supported Chloe Hosking to the gold medal.

On 19 May 2021, it was announced that Cromwell was included within the Australian road cycling team for the delayed Tokyo Olympics, marking her Olympic debut. In a tough and humid road course, Cromwell finished as the best placed Australian in 26th place, almost three minutes seconds behind race winner Anna Kiesenhofer of Austria. On 27 October 2021, it was announced Cromwell would remain as part of the Canyon-SRAM team for a further two years, continuing her mixed program of road and gravel racing through until the end of 2023.

Gravel 
Cromwell's first participation in a gravel event was in August 2019 where she, along with  teammate Ella Harris, lined up in the Steamboat Springs gravel event (SBT GRVL) in Colorado, four days before the Colorado classic road cycling tour. Cromwell completed the blue course in second behind Harris with a time of five hours and six minutes.

This program was due to start in June 2021 but due to her selection for the delayed 2020 Summer Olympics this was postponed to August. To commence her four-race-long gravel calendar, Cromwell participated in her second SBT GRVL on 15 August. For her return, Cromwell competed in the longer  black course and finished 8th in her group, in a time of 7 hours, 32 minutes and 45 seconds. Six days later, she competed in the North Carolina Belgian Waffle Ride (BWR) hosted in Asheville. Cromwell completed the  "waffle" course in 5 hours, 30 minutes and 42 seconds, recording a third-place finish. Cromwell's third gravel race of the year was due to be the three-day event hosted by Gravel Epic in Marrakesh on 7–9 October, but this was postponed due to the COVID-19 pandemic in Morocco. Cromwell's final gravel race of 2021 was held on October 31 and was the  Belgian waffle ride hosted in Lawrence, Kansas. In the race, Cromwell, along with Flávia Oliveira and Hannah Shell, made an early breakaway within the first 10 miles. With around a fifth of the race completed, Shell was dropped by the leading pair and Oliveira made a solo attack at mile 22, leaving Cromwell solo and second on the road. Despite this, not long after, Cromwell caught up to Oliveira and passed her for the lead of the race and competed solo for the remaining miles to secure her first win in gravel racing by almost ten minutes.

Personal life 
Since February 2020, Cromwell has been in a relationship with Finnish racing driver Valtteri Bottas.

Major results 
Source:

2004
 Junior Oceania Games
2nd  Individual pursuit
3rd  Points race
3rd  Scratch
2005
 Junior Oceania Games
2nd  Road race
2nd  Scratch
3rd  Individual pursuit
 Oceania Junior Road Championships
2nd  Road race
4th Time trial
2008
 1st Garrett Lemire Memorial Grand Prix
 1st Sea Otter Classic Circuit Race
 2nd Road race, National Under-23 Road Championships
 4th Holland Hills Classic
 6th Overall Redlands Bicycle Classic
 7th Australia World Cup
2009
 1st Sea Otter Classic Road Race
 1st Stage 3 Tour Féminin en Limousin
 1st Stage 2 (ITT) La Route de France
 3rd Road race, National Under-23 Road Championships
 7th Coupe du Monde Cycliste Féminine de Montréal
 9th Overall Tour of the Gila
 10th Overall Women's Tour of New Zealand
2010
 National Under-23 Road Championships
2nd Road race
2nd Time trial
 2nd Sparkassen Giro
 3rd Overall Women's Tour of New Zealand
 8th Overall Tour Cycliste Féminin International de l'Ardèche
2011
 1st Stage 2 Jayco Bay Cycling Classic
 8th Omloop Het Nieuwsblad
2012
 1st Stage 5 Giro d'Italia Femminile
 2nd Road race, National Road Championships
 2nd GP de Plouay – Bretagne
 7th Open de Suède Vårgårda
 8th Overall Giro della Toscana Int. Femminile – Memorial Michela Fanini
 8th Omloop Het Nieuwsblad
 8th Gooik–Geraardsbergen–Gooik
 9th Overall Grand Prix Elsy Jacobs
2013
 1st Omloop Het Nieuwsblad
 4th Gooik–Geraardsbergen–Gooik
 5th Le Samyn des Dames
 7th Overall Ladies Tour of Qatar
 9th Road race, UCI Road World Championships
 9th Ronde van Drenthe World Cup
 9th La Flèche Wallonne Féminine
 10th Overall La Route de France
 10th Durango-Durango Emakumeen Saria
2014
 2nd GP Comune di Cornaredo
 4th Road race, Commonwealth Games
 5th Road race, UCI Road World Championships
 5th Overall Ladies Tour of Norway
 6th Overall Energiewacht Tour
 6th Overall Auensteiner–Radsporttage
 7th Omloop Het Nieuwsblad
 7th Novilon EDR Cup
 9th Overall Ladies Tour of Qatar
 9th Tour of Flanders for Women
 10th GP de Plouay
2015
 2nd Chrono Champenois
 3rd Dwars door de Westhoek
 4th Grand Prix Cycliste de Gatineau
 5th Omloop Het Nieuwsblad
 6th Ronde van Drenthe World Cup
 7th Overall Ladies Tour of Qatar
 7th Crescent Women World Cup Vårgårda
 9th Overall Tour Cycliste Féminin International de l'Ardèche
 9th Cadel Evans Great Ocean Road Race
 9th EPZ Omloop van Borsele
 10th Overall Energiewacht Tour
1st Stage 2a (TTT)
 10th Winston-Salem Cycling Classic
2016
 1st Stage 4 Giro d'Italia Femminile
 3rd Time trial, National Road Championships
 3rd Omloop Het Nieuwsblad
 4th Acht van Westerveld
 5th Overall Women's Tour Down Under
 6th Cadel Evans Great Ocean Road Race
 7th Overall Ladies Tour of Qatar
 7th La Course by Le Tour de France
 8th Chrono Champenois
 10th Omloop van het Hageland
2017
 1st Stage 1 Thüringen Rundfahrt der Frauen
 3rd Le Samyn des Dames
 6th Pajot Hills Classic
2018
 6th Road race, Commonwealth Games
 7th Overall Women's Herald Sun Tour
 9th Three Days of Bruges–De Panne
2019
 1st Stage 1 (TTT) Giro Rosa
2021
 7th Overall Thüringen Ladies Tour

References

External links 
 Tiffany Cromwell at GreenEDGE Cycling
 
 
 
 
 
 
 
 
 
 

1988 births
Living people
Australian female cyclists
Commonwealth Games competitors for Australia
Cyclists at the 2014 Commonwealth Games
Cyclists at the 2020 Summer Olympics
Olympic cyclists of Australia
20th-century Australian women
21st-century Australian women